Camp Butler may refer to:

 Marine Corps Base Camp Smedley D. Butler, a U.S. Marine Corps base in Okinawa, Japan
 Camp Butler National Cemetery, in Illinois, originally the site of an American Civil War training camp for Union soldiers and a prison camp.
 Camp Butler, in Virginia, a Union camp also known as Camp Misery because of the harsh conditions